Stratigraphy is a branch of geology concerned with the study of rock layers (strata) and layering (stratification). It is primarily used in the study of sedimentary and layered volcanic rocks.
Stratigraphy has three related subfields: lithostratigraphy (lithologic stratigraphy), biostratigraphy (biologic stratigraphy), and chronostratigraphy (stratigraphy by age).

Historical development

Catholic priest Nicholas Steno established the theoretical basis for stratigraphy when he introduced the law of superposition, the principle of original horizontality and the principle of lateral continuity in a 1669 work on the fossilization of organic remains in layers of sediment.

The first practical large-scale application of stratigraphy was by William Smith in the 1790s and early 19th century. Known as the "Father of English geology", Smith recognized the significance of strata or rock layering and the importance of fossil markers for correlating strata; he created the first geologic map of England. Other influential applications of stratigraphy in the early 19th century were by Georges Cuvier and Alexandre Brongniart, who studied the geology of the region around Paris.

Lithostratigraphy

Variation in rock units, most obviously displayed as visible layering, is due to physical contrasts in rock type (lithology). This variation can occur vertically as layering (bedding), or laterally, and reflects changes in environments of deposition (known as facies change). These variations provide a lithostratigraphy or lithologic stratigraphy of the rock unit. Key concepts in stratigraphy involve understanding how certain geometric relationships between rock layers arise and what these geometries imply about their original depositional environment. The basic concept in stratigraphy, called the law of superposition, states: in an undeformed stratigraphic sequence, the oldest strata occur at the base of the sequence.

Chemostratigraphy studies the changes in the relative proportions of trace elements and isotopes within and between lithologic units. Carbon and oxygen isotope ratios vary with time, and researchers can use those to map subtle changes that occurred in the paleoenvironment. This has led to the specialized field of isotopic stratigraphy.

Cyclostratigraphy documents the often cyclic changes in the relative proportions of minerals (particularly carbonates), grain size, thickness of sediment layers (varves) and fossil diversity with time, related to seasonal or longer term changes in palaeoclimates.

Biostratigraphy

Biostratigraphy or paleontologic stratigraphy is based on fossil evidence in the rock layers. Strata from widespread locations containing the same fossil fauna and flora are said to be correlatable in time. Biologic stratigraphy was based on William Smith's principle of faunal succession, which predated, and was one of the first and most powerful lines of evidence for, biological evolution. It provides strong evidence for the formation (speciation) and extinction of species. The geologic time scale was developed during the 19th century, based on the evidence of biologic stratigraphy and faunal succession. This timescale remained a relative scale until the development of radiometric dating, which was based on an absolute time framework, leading to the development of chronostratigraphy.

One important development is the Vail curve, which attempts to define a global historical sea-level curve according to inferences from worldwide stratigraphic patterns. Stratigraphy is also commonly used to delineate the nature and extent of hydrocarbon-bearing reservoir rocks, seals, and traps of petroleum geology.

Chronostratigraphy

Chronostratigraphy is the branch of stratigraphy that places an absolute age, rather than a relative age on rock strata. The branch is concerned with deriving geochronological data for rock units, both directly and inferentially, so that a sequence of time-relative events that created the rocks formation can be derived. The ultimate aim of chronostratigraphy is to place dates on the sequence of deposition of all rocks within a geological region, and then to every region, and by extension to provide an entire geologic record of the Earth.

A gap or missing strata in the geological record of an area is called a stratigraphic hiatus. This may be the result of a halt in the deposition of sediment. Alternatively, the gap may be due to removal by erosion, in which case it may be called a stratigraphic vacuity. It is called a hiatus because deposition was on hold for a period of time. A physical gap may represent both a period of non-deposition and a period of erosion.  A geologic fault may cause the appearance of a hiatus.

Magnetostratigraphy

Magnetostratigraphy is a chronostratigraphic technique used to date sedimentary and volcanic sequences. The method works by collecting oriented samples at measured intervals throughout a section. The samples are analyzed to determine their detrital remanent magnetism (DRM), that is, the polarity of Earth's magnetic field at the time a stratum was deposited. For sedimentary rocks this is possible because, as they fall through the water column, very fine-grained magnetic minerals (< 17 μm) behave like tiny compasses, orienting themselves with Earth's magnetic field. Upon burial, that orientation is preserved. For volcanic rocks, magnetic minerals, which form in the melt, orient themselves with the ambient magnetic field, and are fixed in place upon crystallization of the lava.

Oriented paleomagnetic core samples are collected in the field; mudstones, siltstones, and very fine-grained sandstones are the preferred lithologies because the magnetic grains are finer and more likely to orient with the ambient field during deposition. If the ancient magnetic field were oriented similar to today's field (North Magnetic Pole near the North Rotational Pole), the strata would retain a normal polarity. If the data indicate that the North Magnetic Pole were near the South Rotational Pole, the strata would exhibit reversed polarity.

Results of the individual samples are analyzed by removing the natural remanent magnetization (NRM) to reveal the DRM. Following statistical analysis, the results are used to generate a local magnetostratigraphic column that can then be compared against the Global Magnetic Polarity Time Scale.

This technique is used to date sequences that generally lack fossils or interbedded igneous rocks. The continuous nature of the sampling means that it is also a powerful technique for the estimation of sediment-accumulation rates.

See also

 Assise
 Bed (geology)
 Conodont biostratigraphy
 Erygmascope (old instrument for studying strata)
 Harris matrix
 Important publications in stratigraphy
 International Commission on Stratigraphy
 Key bed
 Sedimentary basin analysis
 Sequence stratigraphy
 Sadler effect
 Tectonostratigraphy

References

Further reading
Christopherson, R. W., 2008. Geosystems: An Introduction to Physical Geography, 7th ed., New York: Pearson Prentice-Hall. 
Montenari, M., 2016. Stratigraphy and Timescales, 1st ed., Amsterdam: Academic Press (Elsevier).

External links

ICS Subcommission for Stratigraphic Information
University of South Carolina Sequence Stratigraphy Web
Front Range stratigraphy
International Commission on Stratigraphy
University of Georgia (USA) Stratigraphy Lab
Stratigraphy.net A stratigraphic data provider.
Agenames.org A global index of stratigraphic terms

 
Petrology
Methods in archaeology